Otogar is a proposed underground station and the eastern terminus of the Halkapınar—Otogar Line of the İzmir Metro. It will be located beneath the İzmir Coach Terminal in the southern Bornova district. Construction of the station, along with the metro line, is scheduled to begin in 2018. Connection to many intercity bus lines will be available from the station and with its completion, each major transit hub in the city will have access to rail transportation. 

Otogar station is expected to open in 2020.

References

İzmir Metro
Konak District
Proposed rapid transit stations in Turkey